Lewie Griffith Merritt (nicknamed "Griff") (June 26, 1897 – March 24, 1974) was a Major General and early aviator in the United States Marine Corps.  Merritt served over 30 years in the Marine Corps, including service in World War I at Belleau Wood and as an aviator during World War II in both the European and Pacific Theaters.  After retiring from the Marine Corps, Merritt practiced law in South Carolina.

Education and career
Lewie Merritt was born on June 26, 1897, in Ridge Springs, South Carolina. In 1917, Merritt graduated from The Citadel at the age of 19 and received a commission in the United States Marine Corps.  He served in the Dominican Republic that same year, and in 1918 served in France during World War I. He and several other Citadel graduates became a part of the famous 'Devil Dogs' of Marine Corps legend at the Battle of Belleau Wood in 1918.  Following the war Merritt served on the staff of 2 Marine Corps Commandants and was commander of the Marine detachment on the battleship USS New Mexico.

In 1923, Merritt began training as a naval aviator at Pensacola Naval Air Station; he received his "Wings of Gold" in January, 1924.  In 1928 he received a law degree from George Washington University followed by service with the Navy Judge Advocate Generals Office in Washington, DC.

Merritt became one of the first Marine aviators qualified to fly off aircraft carriers and is credited with developing the concepts of dive bombing and close air support; his advocacy of air power was instrumental in helping integrate aviation into Marine combat doctrine.  Merritt commanded an observation squadron in Haiti and attended the Army Air Corps Tactical School; in 1941 he was assigned as commander for air, Fleet Marine Force Pacific, where he was responsible for establishing the 2d Marine Air Wing in Hawaii and bolstering defenses at Wake and Midway Islands.  In January 1942 he was promoted to brigadier general and assigned as air attache at the US Embassy in London.

World War II
During World War II, Merritt traveled to Cairo, Egypt to observe British air operations in desert warfare.  There he had the unusual distinction of being shot down while a passenger on a Royal Air Force Wellington bomber.

General Merritt was reassigned to command the Fourth Marine Air Wing in the Central Pacific, where his leadership was instrumental in the success of the Tarawa and Kwajalein Air Campaigns, and critical air support of Marine Corps amphibious operations in the Pacific.  While serving as Commanding General of the 1st MAW during the New Ireland and New Britain campaigns, he personally directed air support missions against Japanese forces and also commanded all Allied air units in the Northern Solomons. General Merritt was the only Marine Corps Aviator to serve in both the European and Asian Theaters of battle during World War II.

Later years
After the war, Merritt served on President Harry S. Truman's Strategic Bombing Survey, which examined U.S. bombing successes against Japanese targets; he retired from the Marine Corps in 1947. Merritt practiced law in Columbia, South Carolina, then was chosen by Governor Strom Thurmond to serve as director of the South Carolina Legislative Council. He also managed the successful campaign of Lt. Gov. George Timmerman for governor in 1956.

He died after a lengthy illness at Fort Sam Houston, Texas, on March 24, 1974.  He is buried at Arlington National Cemetery.

In 1975, the airfield at Marine Corps Air Station Beaufort in Beaufort, South Carolina, was renamed in his honor; it is now known as Merritt Field.

Decorations

See also 

 List of 1st Marine Aircraft Wing commanders

References

1897 births
1975 deaths
United States Marine Corps personnel of World War I
Burials at Arlington National Cemetery
The Citadel, The Military College of South Carolina alumni
George Washington University Law School alumni
Recipients of the Legion of Merit
Shot-down aviators
United States Marine Corps generals
United States Marine Corps World War II generals
United States Naval Aviators
American military personnel of the Banana Wars
Military personnel from South Carolina